Vladimir Ivanovich Synyavsky (18 February 1932 – 27 December 2012) was a lightweight freestyle wrestler from Ukraine who won a world title in 1959 and placed second at the 1960 Olympics and 1961 World Championships. At the 1959 World Championships he won all his opponents by fall.

Sinyavsky took up wrestling in 1950, when he started to work at the Kharkiv Electromechanical Plant UkrElektroMash, and won the Soviet lightweight title in 1957–59 and 1961, finishing second in 1960. His left wrist was handicapped for life by an explosion during World War II. After retiring from competitions in 1966 he worked as a wrestling coach in Kyiv.

References

External links

1932 births
2012 deaths
Soviet male sport wrestlers
Olympic wrestlers of the Soviet Union
Wrestlers at the 1960 Summer Olympics
Ukrainian male sport wrestlers
Olympic silver medalists for the Soviet Union
Olympic medalists in wrestling
Medalists at the 1960 Summer Olympics
Sportspeople from Kharkiv Oblast